Margaret Mayo, née Margaret Mary Cumming (born 10 May 1935 in London, England), is a British writer of children's literature and folktales since 1974.

Biography
Born Margaret Mary Cumming on 10 May 1935 in London, England, the daughter of William John and Anna (Macleod) Cumming. On 28 July 1958, she married Peter Robin Mayo, they had three children: Roderick, Katrina and Andrew. She was former teacher, who lives in Brighton.

Bibliography

Anthologies
If You Should Meet a Crocodile (1974)
Book of Magical Horses (1976)
Book of Magical Birds (1977)
Book of Magical Cats (1978)
The Italian Fairy Book (1981)
Fairy Tales from France (1983)
The Orchard Book of Magical Tales (1993)
Magical Tales from Many Lands (1993)
Magical Tales (1993)
First Fairy Tales (1994)
The Orchard Book of Creation Stories (1995)
The Orchard Book of Mythical Birds and Beasts (1996)
Mythical Birds and Beasts from Many Lands (1997)
First Bible Stories (1998)
Sleepytime Stories (1998)
The Orchard Book of the Unicorn and Other Magical Animals (2001)
A Pea, a Princess and a Pig: Fairy Stories (2001)
Wiggle Waggle Fun: Stories And Rhymes for the Very, Very Young (2002)
Cinderella (2002)
Hansel and Gretal (2002)
Jack and the Beanstalk (2002)
Snow White (2002)
The Orchard Book of Favourite Stories and Poems (2003)
The Orchard Book of Favourite Rhymes and Verse (2003)

Novels
Saints, Birds and Beasts (1980)
Brother Sun, Sister Moon (1999)

Picture Books
Little Mouse Twitchy-whiskers (1992)
How to Count Crocodiles (1994)
Plum Pudding (2000)
Dig Dig Digging (2001)
Emergency! (2002)
Toot Toot Clickety Clack (2004)
The Frog Prince (2005)
Puss in Boots (2006)
Choo Choo Clickerty-clack! (2006)
Roar! (2006)
Snap! (2010)
Stomp, Dinosaur, Stomp! (2010)

Creation Myths
How Earth Was Made (1998)
How Men and Women Were Made (1998)
How the Sun Was Made and Other Stories (1998)
Why the Sea Is Salt and Other Stories (1998)

Magical Tales from Around the World
The Fiery Phoenix (2003)
The Giant Sea Serpent (2003)
The Incredible Thunderbird (2003)
The Magical Mermaid (2003)
The Man Eating Minotaur (2003)
Pegasus and the Proud Prince (2003)
Unanana and the Enormous Elephant (2003)
Pegasus and the Prince (2004)

References and Resources

External links 

 

English writers
1935 births
Living people
English women novelists
English children's writers
British women children's writers
Women anthologists